Henry Kenneth Alfred Russell (3 July 1927 – 27 November 2011) was a British film director, known for his pioneering work in television and film and for his flamboyant and controversial style.  His films in the main were liberal adaptations of existing texts, or biographies, notably of composers of the Romantic era. Russell began directing for the BBC, where he made creative adaptations of composers' lives which were unusual for the time. He also directed many feature films independently and for studios.

Russell is best known for his Oscar-winning film Women in Love (1969), The Devils (1971), The Who's Tommy (1975), and the science fiction film Altered States (1980). Russell also directed several films based on the lives of classical music composers, such as Elgar, Delius, Tchaikovsky, Mahler, and Liszt.

Film critic Mark Kermode, speaking in 2006, and attempting to sum up the director's achievement, called Russell "somebody who proved that British cinema didn't have to be about kitchen-sink realism—it could be every bit as flamboyant as Fellini.  Later in his life he turned to making low-budget experimental films such as The Lion's Mouth and Revenge of the Elephant Man, and they are as edgy and 'out there' as ever".

Early life
Russell was born in Southampton, Hampshire, England, on 3 July 1927, the elder of two sons of Ethel (née Smith) and Henry Russell, a shoeshop owner. His father was distant and took out his rage on his family, so Russell spent much of his time at the cinema with his mother, who was mentally ill. He cited the films Die Nibelungen and The Secret of the Loch as two early influences.

He was educated at private schools in Walthamstow and at Pangbourne College, and studied photography at Walthamstow Technical College (now part of the University of East London).

Military service
He harboured a childhood ambition to be a ballet dancer but instead joined the Royal Air Force and the British Merchant Navy as a teenager. On one occasion he was made to stand watch in the blazing sun for hours on end while crossing the Pacific Ocean, as his mentally ill captain feared an attack by Japanese midget submarines despite the Pacific War having ended. He moved into television work after short careers in dance and photography.

Photography
In 1954 Russell started work as a local-interest freelance photographer. His series of documentary 'Teddy Girl' photographs were published in Picture Post magazine in June 1955, and he continued to work as a freelance documentary photographer until 1959.

During this time, he started directing short films: Peepshow (1956), Knights on Bikes (1956), and Lourdes (1959). He received a lot of acclaim for his short Amelia and the Angel (1959), which helped secure him a job at the BBC.

Television

Documentaries
Between 1959 and 1970, Russell directed arts documentaries for Monitor and Omnibus.

He made Poet's London (1959, about John Betjeman), Portrait of a Goon (1959, about Spike Milligan), Gordon Jacob (1959), The Guitar Craze (1959), Variations on a Mechanical Theme (1959), Scottish Painters (1959), Marie Rambert Remembers (1960), The Strange World of Hieronymus Bosch (1960), The Miners' Picnic (1960), Architecture of Entertainment (1960), A House in Bayswater (1960), Shelagh Delaney's Salford (1960), Cranks at Work (1960, about John Cranko), The Light Fantastic (1960),  Journey Into a Lost World (1960), Lotte Lenya Sings Kurt Weill (1961), Old Battersea House (1961), Portrait of a Soviet Composer (1961), London Moods (1961), Antonio Gaudi (1961), Preservation Man (1962), Mr. Chesher's Traction Engines (1962), The Lonely Shore (1962) and Watch the Birdie (1962).

Russell's films began to get longer: Pop Goes the Easel (1962) and the much admired Elgar (1962) about Sir Edward Elgar. Elgar was the first time that a television arts programme (Monitor) was dedicated to one artistic figure, rather than having a magazine format. It was also the first time that re-enactments were used. Russell fought with the BBC over using actors to portray different ages of the same character, instead of the traditional photograph stills and documentary footage.

Early features and rising fame

Russell's first feature film was French Dressing (1964), a comedy loosely based on Roger Vadim's And God Created Woman; its critical and commercial failure led Russell to work further for the BBC. For television he made the 16-minute Lonely Shore (1964), the longer Bartok (1964) (about Béla Bartók), and The Dotty World of James Lloyd (1964). In 1964 he planned to make an adaptation of Anthony Burgess's A Clockwork Orange (1962) starring the Rolling Stones, but abandoned the film after the British Board of Censors advised it would not approve it.

Russell had a noted critical success with the TV movie The Debussy Film (1965) starring Oliver Reed as Claude Debussy based on a script by Melvyn Bragg. Also well received was Always on Sunday (1965), written by Bragg, about Henri Rousseau.

Russell made Don't Shoot the Composer (1966), a documentary about composer Georges Delerue. He did the highly praised Isadora Duncan, the Biggest Dancer in the World (1967), about Isadora Duncan with Vivian Pickles.

Russell's television work prompted producer Harry Saltzman to hire him to direct a feature film, Billion Dollar Brain (1967), the third Harry Palmer movie starring Michael Caine. He wanted to follow it with a biopic of Vaslav Nijinsky but Brain was a commercial disappointment.

He returned to television for Dante's Inferno (1967) with Reed as Dante Gabriel Rossetti and Song of Summer (1968) about Frederick Delius and Eric Fenby. He once said that the best film he ever made was Song of Summer, and that he would not edit a single shot.

Feature film director

Women in Love
In 1969, Russell directed what is considered his "signature film", Women In Love, an adaptation of D. H. Lawrence's novel of the same name about two artist sisters living in post-World War I Britain. The film starred Glenda Jackson, Oliver Reed, Jennie Linden and Alan Bates. The film is notable for its nude wrestling scene, which broke the convention at the time that a mainstream movie could not show male genitalia.  Women in Love connected with the sexual revolution and bohemian politics of the late 1960s. It received four Oscar nominations, including his only nomination for Best Director.

The film was BAFTA-nominated for the costume designs of Russell's first wife, Shirley; they collaborated throughout the 1970s. The colour schemes of Luciana Arrighi's art direction (also BAFTA-nominated) and Billy William's cinematography, which Russell used for metaphorical effect, are also often referred to by film textbooks.

Russell returned to television with Dance of the Seven Veils (1970) which sought to portray Richard Strauss as a Nazi: one scene in particular showed a Jewish man being tortured while a group of SS men look on in delight, with Strauss's music as the score. The Strauss family was so outraged by the film that they withdrew all music rights.  The film was effectively banned from being screened until Strauss's copyright expired in 2019. It was shown in February 2020 at the Keswick Film Festival.

Three films in 1971
He followed Women in Love with a string of innovative adult-themed films which were often as controversial as they were successful. The Music Lovers (1971), a biopic of Tchaikovsky, starred Richard Chamberlain as a flamboyant Pyotr Tchaikovsky and Glenda Jackson as his wife. The score was conducted by André Previn.

He followed it with The Devils (1971), a film so provocative that the production company, Warner Bros., refused to release it, unless cuts were made. Inspired by Aldous Huxley's book The Devils of Loudun and using material from John Whiting's play The Devils, it starred Oliver Reed as a priest who stands in the way of a corrupt church and state. Helped by publicity over the more sensational scenes, featuring sexuality among nuns, the film topped British box office receipts for eight weeks. In the United States, the film, which had already been cut for distribution in Britain, was further edited but never widely released theatrically in anything like its original state; the original, uncut version has only been shown in the U.S. at film festivals and art houses. In 2017, AMC Networks-owned horror film streaming service Shudder premiered the uncut version of the film for the first time on streaming.

British film critic Alexander Walker described the film as "monstrously indecent" in a television confrontation with Russell, leading the director to hit him with a rolled up copy of the Evening Standard, the newspaper for which Walker worked. The uncut version of the film remains censored.

Russell followed The Devils with a reworking of the period musical The Boy Friend (1971), for which he cast the model Twiggy, who won two Golden Globe Awards for her performance: one for Best Actress in a musical comedy, and one for the best newcomer. The film was heavily cut and shorn of two musical numbers for its American release; it was not a big success.

Mid-1970s films
Russell wanted to make Little Sparrow, a film about Édith Piaf, or a biopic of King Ludwig of Bavaria, but neither was made. Instead, he himself provided most of the financing for Savage Messiah (1972). The film is a biopic of the painter and sculptor Henri Gaudier-Brzeska, who died fighting for France at age 23, in 1915, in the trenches of the Western Front during the First World War. The film stars Dorothy Tutin, Scott Antony, and Helen Mirren.

Russell announced a biopic of Sarah Bernhardt with Barbra Streisand but it was not made.

He worked with David Puttnam on Mahler (1974) starring Robert Powell as Gustav Mahler.

In 1975, Russell's star-studded film version of The Who's rock opera Tommy starring Roger Daltrey, Ann-Margret, Oliver Reed, Elton John, Tina Turner, Eric Clapton and Jack Nicholson, spent a record fourteen weeks at the No.1 spot.

Two months before Tommy was released (in March 1975), Russell started work on Lisztomania (1975), another vehicle for Roger Daltrey, and for the film scoring of progressive rock keyboardist Rick Wakeman. In the film, the music of Franz Liszt is stolen by Richard Wagner.  Wagner's operas then put forward the theme of the Superman. Tommy and Lisztomania were important in the rise of improved motion picture sound in the 1970s, as they were among the first films to be released with Dolby-encoded soundtracks. Lisztomania, tagged as "the film that out-Tommys 'Tommy'", topped the British box-office for two weeks in November 1975, when Tommy was still in the list of the week's top five box-office hits.

Russell's next film, the biopic Valentino (1977), starring Rudolf Nureyev as Rudolph Valentino, also topped the British box-office for two weeks, but was not a hit in America. After this he said "nobody in Hollywood would give me even a B movie to direct."

Return to television and Altered States
Russell returned to television with William and Dorothy (1978) a look at the life of William Wordsworth and his sister Dorothy, and The Rime of the Ancient Mariner (1978), about Samuel Taylor Coleridge.

Russell went to Hollywood to make Altered States (1980), a departure in both genre and tone, in that it is Russell's only foray into science fiction.  Working from Paddy Chayefsky's screenplay (based upon his novel), Russell used his penchant for elaborate visual effects to translate Chayefsky's hallucinatory story to the cinema, and took the opportunity to add his trademark religious and sexual imagery. The film had an innovative Oscar-nominated score by John Corigliano. The film enjoyed moderate financial success, and scored with critics who had otherwise dismissed Russell's work. Roger Ebert, who had given The Devils "zero stars", and had panned Russell's early composer portraits (he did, however, give three stars to both Tommy and Lisztomania), gave it his highest rating for Russell's work (three-and-a-half stars), praising it as "one hell of a movie!"

Although the film was a financial success, Russell had difficulty making his next film. One project, Beethoven's Secret, was about to start shooting when financing fell apart at the last minute. He was attached to do the film of Evita for over a year, but ultimately left the project when he refused to cast Elaine Paige in the lead. A biopic of Maria Callas with Sophia Loren also failed to get financing. However, Russell found himself artistically rejuvenated when offered the chance to direct some opera. He did The Rake's Progress, Soldiers and Butterfly.

Russell's next film after Altered States was The Planets (1983), about Gustav Holst's musical suite of the same name. This 53-minute film was made specially for The South Bank Show, the weekly arts programme on the ITV network in Britain. It is a wordless collage that matches stock footage to each of the seven movements of the Holst suite.  John Coulthart wrote "familiar Russell obsessions appear: Nazis, naked women and the inevitable crucifixion." After essentially disappearing for decades, in 2016 the film was re-released on DVD by Arthaus Musik.

For The South Bank Show, Russell also made Vaughan Williams: A Symphonic Portrait (1984) about Ralph Vaughan Williams.

Russell returned to feature films with a sexual thriller, Crimes of Passion (1984), starring Anthony Perkins and Kathleen Turner for New World Pictures. It had moderate critical success and did not perform well at the box office, but was a big hit on video.

Opera and music videos
In 1985, he directed Gounod's Faust at the Vienna State Opera, conducted by Erich Binder with Francisco Araiza, Ruggero Raimondi and Gabriela Beňačková in the main roles. He also did successful productions of La bohème and Madama Butterfly.

Russell set up a company, Sitting Duck, to make music videos. "Videos are a magic new art form," he said. Among those he made were "Nikita" for Elton John and "Phantom of the Opera" for Andrew Lloyd Webber.

Russell had a legal fight with Bob Guccione over an aborted attempt to film Moll Flanders, which was dramatised in a movie, Your Honour, I Object! (1987).

Vestron Pictures
Russell directed Gothic (1986) with Gabriel Byrne, about the night Mary Shelley told the tale of Frankenstein. It was a hit on video for Vestron Pictures, who signed Russell to a three-picture contract.

Russell did one of the segments for Aria (1987), and for British TV made Ken Russell's ABC of British Music (1988) and A British Picture (1989).

For the Vestron deal, he directed Salome's Last Dance (1988), a loosely adapted esoteric tribute to Oscar Wilde's controversial play Salome, which was banned on the 19th century London stage. The cult movie defines Russell's adult themed romance with the Theatre of The Poor and was also notable for the screen presence of Imogen Millais-Scott as Salome.

He made another two pictures for Vestron: The Lair of the White Worm (1988) with Amanda Donohoe and Hugh Grant, based on a novella by Bram Stoker, and The Rainbow (1989), another D. H. Lawrence adaptation, which also happens to be the prequel to Women in Love. Glenda Jackson played the mother of her character in the previous film.

Russell directed the opera Mefistofele (1989).

Later career
In the 1990 film The Russia House, starring Sean Connery and Michelle Pfeiffer, Russell made one of his first significant acting appearances, portraying Walter, an ambiguously gay British MI6 intelligence officer who discomfits his more strait-laced CIA counterparts. Russell thenceforth occasionally acted.

He directed a segment of Women and Men: Stories of Seduction (1990) and for TV did The Strange Affliction of Anton Bruckner (1991).

In 1991, Russell directed Whore. It was highly controversial and branded with an NC-17 rating for its sexual content. The MPAA and the theatre chains also refused to release posters or advertise a film called Whore, so for this purpose the film was re-titled If You Can't Say It, Just See It. Russell protested his film being given such a rating when Pretty Woman got an R, on the grounds that his film showed the real hardships of being a prostitute, and the other glorified it.

The film Prisoner of Honor (1991) allowed Russell a further opportunity to explore his abiding interest in anti-Semitism through a factually-based account of the Dreyfus affair in the French Third Republic.  The movie featured Richard Dreyfuss in the central role of Colonel Georges Picquart, the French Army investigator who exposed the army establishment's framing of the Jewish officer Captain Alfred Dreyfus.

By the early 1990s, Russell had become a celebrity: his notoriety and persona attracted more attention than his recent work. He became largely reliant on his own finances to continue making films. Much of his work after 1990 was commissioned for television (e.g. his 1993 TV film The Mystery of Dr Martinu), and he contributed regularly to The South Bank Show including documentaries such as Classic Widows about the widows of four leading British composers; dance sections in these were choreographed by Amir Hosseinpour.

Prisoner of Honor (1991) was Russell's final work with Oliver Reed. His final film with Glenda Jackson before she gave up acting for politics was The Secret Life of Arnold Bax (1992).

He directed Lady Chatterley (1993), The Mystery of Dr Martinu (1993), a version of Treasure Island (1995), Alice in Russialand (1995), Mindbender (1995) (about Uri Geller), and an episode of Tales of Erotica.

In May 1995, he was honoured with a retrospective of his work presented in Hollywood by the American Cinematheque. Titled Shock Value, it included some of Russell's most successful and controversial films and also several of his early BBC productions. Russell attended the festival and engaged in lengthy post-screening discussions of each film with audiences and moderator Martin Lewis, who had instigated and curated the retrospective.

Later films include Dogboys (1998), The Fall of the Louse of Usher (2002), and Elgar: Fantasy of a Composer on a Bicycle (2002).

Russell had a cameo in the 2006 film adaptation of Brian Aldiss's novel Brothers of the Head by the directors of Lost in La Mancha. He also had a cameo in the 2006 film Colour Me Kubrick. He directed a segment for the horror anthology Trapped Ashes (2007), which also included segments directed by Sean S. Cunningham, Monte Hellman, and Joe Dante. Prior to his death in 2011 he was reputed to be in pre-production for two films: The Pearl of the Orient and Kings X.

Efforts such as The Lion's Mouth (2000) and The Fall of the Louse of Usher (2002) have suffered from low production values (for example, being shot on video on Russell's estate, often featuring Russell himself) and limited distribution.

In 2003 he was a member of the jury at the 25th Moscow International Film Festival. He also acted in "Final Cut", an episode of the BBC Television series Waking the Dead, playing the role of an aging director of a notorious 1960s crime drama similar to Performance.

From 2004, Russell was visiting professor at the University of Wales, Newport Film School. One of his many tasks was to advise students on the making of their graduate films. He also presented the Finest Film Awards (for graduate filmmakers of Newport) in June 2005.

Russell was appointed visiting fellow at Southampton Solent University and later at the University of Southampton in April 2007, where he acted in a similar capacity to his role at the Newport Film School, until March 2008. His arrival was celebrated with a screening of the rare director's cut of The Devils hosted by Mark Kermode.

He began production of his first full-length film in almost five years, Moll Flanders, an adaptation of Daniel Defoe's novel, starring Lucinda Rhodes-Flaherty and Barry Humphries, but a finished film failed to materialise.

In 2007, Russell produced A Kitten for Hitler, a short film hosted by the Comedybox.tv website. Russell commented that "Ten years ago, while working on The South Bank Show, Melvyn Bragg and I had a heated discussion on the pros and cons of film censorship. Broadly speaking, Melvyn was against it, while I, much to his surprise, was absolutely for it. He then dared me to write a script that I thought should be banned. I accepted the challenge and a month or so later sent him a short subject entitled A Kitten for Hitler. 'Ken,' he said, 'if ever you make this film and it is shown, you will be lynched.' "

Russell joined the cast of the British reality television show Celebrity Big Brother in January 2007, at the start of the series, but left voluntarily within a week after an altercation with fellow housemate Jade Goody. At the age of 79, he was then the oldest person to be a contestant on the programme.

Russell and his wife Elize "Lisi" Tribble were invited by New York film writer Shade Rupe on a six-week journey across North America, beginning with a Lifetime Achievement Award given by Mitch Davis at the Fantasia film festival on 20 July 2010, followed by a screening of Russell's most notorious film, The Devils. The next day, a near complete 35mm print retrospective of Russell's work at the Cinémathèque québécoise including Billion Dollar Brain, Women in Love, The Music Lovers, Crimes of Passion, The Rainbow, Whore, and many more found projection along with an exhibition of several of Russell's photographs from the 1950s. The next stop was Russellmania! at the Lincoln Center, a nine-film overview of Russell's work from Women in Love through Valentino, with Russell present at each evening screening for a nearly sold-out weeklong festival. On 30 July 2010, for the opening night, Russell was joined by Vanessa Redgrave for a 40th anniversary screening of The Devils and the next evening saw The Music Lovers and Women in Love projected with Russell in attendance. Tommy Tune joined Russell the next evening for The Boy Friend and followed the screening with a live stage dance number from the film.

The American Cinematheque in Los Angeles next hosted Russell at the Aero Theatre in Santa Monica with screenings of The Devils and Altered States with Charles Haid and Stuart Baird in attendance, and Tommy and Lisztomania at the Egyptian the following evening. Director Mick Garris extended an invitation and  Russell, Tribble, and Rupe joined the Masters of Horror for one of their rarified dinners. The tour wrapped up in Toronto at the Rue Morgue Festival of Fear and a packed screening of The Devils at the Bloor Cinema hosted by Richard Crouse.

In 2008, he made his New York directorial debut with the Off-Broadway production of Mindgame at the SoHo Playhouse produced by Monica Tidwell, a thriller by Anthony Horowitz and starring Keith Carradine, Lee Godart and Kathleen McNenny.

Towards the end of his life, Russell was planning a remake of the 1976 erotic musical comedy Alice in Wonderland.

Personal life
Russell converted to Roman Catholicism during the 1950s; he described The Devils as being the "last nail in the coffin of my Catholic faith."

He was married four times.  His first marriage, to costume designer Shirley Kingdon from 1958 to 1978, produced four sons and a daughter.  He was married to Vivian Jolly from 1984 to 1991 (the wedding celebrant being Anthony Perkins, who had been ordained in the Universal Life Church); the couple had a son and daughter. He was married to the actress and former ballerina Hetty Baynes from 1992 to 1997; the couple had a son.  His first three marriages ended in divorce.  He married American actress and artist Elize "Lisi" Tribble in 2001, and the marriage lasted until his death.

Death
Ken Russell died on 27 November 2011 at the age of 84, having suffered a series of strokes; he was survived by his wife and eight children. Before his death, he left his entire estate to his wife.

Writings

Besides books on film-making and the British film industry, Russell also wrote A British Picture:  An Autobiography (1989; published in the US as Altered States: The Autobiography of Ken Russell, 1991). He also published six novels, including four on the sex lives of composers – Beethoven Confidential, Brahms Gets Laid, Elgar: The Erotic Variations, and Delius: A Moment with Venus.

Mike and Gaby's Space Gospel is a science-fiction rewriting of Genesis. His last novel, also science-fiction and published in 2006, is called Violation. It is a very violent future-shock tale of an England where football has become the national religion.

At the time of his death, he had a column for The Times in the Film section of times 2.

Selected filmography

Photography
Before achieving success in the film industry, Russell was a stills photographer for a period. An exhibition displaying some of Russell's work was on display during the summer of 2007 in central London's Proud Galleries in The Strand, London. The exhibition, entitled Ken Russell's Lost London Rediscovered: 1951–1957, included photos taken in and around London, with many of the pictures being taken in the Portobello Road area of London. An exhibition Ken Russell: Filmmaker, Photographer ran at several galleries in 2010.

Music video
In the late-1980s, Russell directed the music video for "It's All Coming Back to Me Now", a song written and produced by Jim Steinman for his Pandora's Box project. The production featured a range of erotic imagery, including studded bras and spiked codpieces. He had also directed Elton John's video for "Nikita" which featured a scene of John wearing the same boots he wore as the Pinball Wizard in the film adaptation of The Who's Tommy.

Cultural references

Light-hearted references to Russell often allude to sexual and religious (frequently Catholic) images in his work.

In his 1973 novel The Honorary Consul, English novelist Graham Greene includes a passage in which a "Conservative Member of Parliament had described the British entry [in the Mar del Plata Film Festival in Argentina] by some man named Russell as pornographic."

References

Further reading

External links

 
 
 Savage Messiah – a Ken Russell site by Iain Fisher
 Ken Russell's film on Delius, Song of Summer
 Ken Russell on Television – British Film Institute. Video clips are restricted, but the text can be read.
 Ken Russell Discussion Group : The Lair of Ken Russell
 BBC Interview with Ken Russell and Tony Lane on Invasion of the Not Quite Dead (2008)
 Ken Russell interview - BBC Film Network. Sept 2008
 places that have inspired Russell's film-making - BBC
 Ken Russell on his early career in ballet and photography (19 June 2010)
 The musical legacy of Ken Russell John Bridcut, The Guardian music blog, 28 November 2011]
 "10 Nude Scenes To Make You Cringe!" - Obsessed With Film blog, 16 November 2010
 Trauma as Memory in Ken Russell's Mahler, by Eftychia Papanikolaou; chapter in After Mahler's Death, edited by Gerold W. Gruber, Morten Solvik and Jan Vičar, 72–89. Olomouc, Czech Republic: Palacký University, 2013.

1927 births
2011 deaths
Alumni of the University of East London
British Merchant Navy personnel
Converts to Roman Catholicism
English film directors
English-language film directors
Horror film directors
People educated at Pangbourne College
Academics of the University of Wales, Newport
People from Southampton
Royal Air Force personnel of World War II
Academic staff of the University of Wollongong